Daniel Goa (born 1953) is a New Caledonian politician elected to head the Caledonian Union in 2012. He was a Petitioner on the Question of New Caledonia at the Fourth Committee on Special Political and Decolonization of the United Nations.

References

Caledonian Union politicians
1953 births
Living people
Date of birth missing (living people)